Xinjiang Uyghur (older spellings variously include Sinkiang Uyghur, Sinkiang Uygur, Sinkiang Uighur etc.) may refer to:
 Uyghurs in Xinjiang
 The Xinjiang standard of the Uyghur language

See also 
 Xinjiang, an autonomous region of China for the Uyghur ethnic minority
 Autonomous administrative divisions of China
 Apostolic Prefecture of Xinjiang-Urumqi